Julian Usano Martinez (born 8 July 1976 in Museros) is a former Spanish cyclist. He rode in the 2003 Tour de France and the 2003 Giro d'Italia.

Major results
1999
1st stage 1 Volta del Llagostí

References

1976 births
Living people
Spanish male cyclists
People from Horta Nord
Sportspeople from the Province of Valencia
Cyclists from the Valencian Community